The atlanto-occipital joint (Capsula articularis atlantooccipitalis) is an articulation between the atlas bone and the occipital bone. It consists of a pair of condyloid joints. It is a synovial joint.

Structure 
The atlanto-occipital joint is an articulation between the atlas bone and the occipital bone. It consists of a pair of condyloid joints. It is a synovial joint.

Ligaments
The ligaments connecting the bones are:

 Two articular capsules
 Posterior atlanto-occipital membrane
 Anterior atlanto-occipital membrane

Capsule
The capsules of the atlantooccipital articulation surround the condyles of the occipital bone, and connect them with the articular processes of the atlas: they are thin and loose.

Function
The movements permitted in this joint are:
 (a) flexion and extension around the mediolateral axis, which give rise to the ordinary forward and backward nodding of the head.
 (b) slight lateral motion, lateroflexion, to one or other side around the anteroposterior axis.

Flexion is produced mainly by the action of the longi capitis and recti capitis anteriores; extension by the recti capitis posteriores major and minor, the obliquus capitis superior, the semispinalis capitis, splenius capitis, sternocleidomastoideus, and upper fibers of the trapezius.

The recti laterales are concerned in the lateral movement, assisted by the trapezius, splenius capitis, semispinalis capitis, and the sternocleidomastoideus of the same side, all acting together.

Clinical significance

Dislocation 
The atlanto-occipital joint may be dislocated, especially from violent accidents such as traffic collisions. This may be diagnosed using CT scans or magnetic resonance imaging of the head and neck. Surgery may be used to fix the joint and any associated bone fractures. Neck movement may be reduced long after this injury. Such injuries may also lead to hypermobility, which may be diagnosed with radiographs. This is especially true if traction is used during treatment.

Additional images

References

Joints
Joints of the head and neck